Sefid Bon (also Romanized as Sefīd Bon) is a village in Zhavarud-e Gharbi Rural District, Kalatrazan District, Sanandaj County, Kurdistan Province, Iran. At the 2006 census, its population was 165, in 48 families. The village is populated by Kurds.

References 

Towns and villages in Sanandaj County
Kurdish settlements in Kurdistan Province